The name Fifi has been used for five tropical cyclones worldwide: two in the Atlantic Ocean, one in the South-West Indian Ocean, and two in the Australian region.

In the Atlantic:
 Hurricane Fifi (1958) – paralleled the Lesser Antilles without making landfall
 Hurricane Fifi (1974) – a devastating system that killed thousands in Honduras and passed into the Pacific, becoming Hurricane Orlene

In the South-West Indian:
 Cyclone Fifi (1977)

In the Australian region:
 Cyclone Daphne-Fifi (1982)
 Cyclone Fifi (1991) – killed 29 in Western Australia

Atlantic hurricane set index articles
Australian region cyclone set index articles